The Era of Vampires is a 2002 Hong Kong martial arts horror film directed by Wellson Chin and written and produced by Tsui Hark. An edited version of the film was released in North America under the title Tsui Hark's Vampire Hunters. The film lacked comedy, a departure from earlier jiangshi films like Mr. Vampire that were popular in the 1980s.

Cast
Danny Chan Kwok-kwan as Choi
Michael Chow as Fat
Ken Chang as Hei
Lam Suet as Kung
Yu Rongguang as Master Jiang
Anya as Sasa
Horace Lee as Dragon Tang
Ji Chun-hua as Master Mao Shan
Chen Kuan-tai as Zombie wrangler
Lee Kin-yan as Geomancer
Lee Lik-chi as Butler
Wong Yat-fei as Undertaker
Sze Mei-yee as Clothing salesman
Zou Na as Ling

References

External links
 
 The Era of Vampires at the Hong Kong Movie DataBase
 HK cinemagic entry

Hong Kong martial arts films
Hong Kong action horror films
Jiangshi films
2002 films
2002 horror films
2000s action horror films
2002 martial arts films
Martial arts horror films
Hong Kong supernatural horror films
2000s Hong Kong films
2000s Cantonese-language films